Raorchestes dubois is a species of frog in the family Rhacophoridae.

It is known from the southern Western Ghats, near Kodaikanal in Dindigul District in the state of Tamil Nadu in India.
Its habitats include roadside vegetation and gardens.

Name
The species is named in honour of Alain Dubois, a French herpetologist.

References

External links 

 
 
 

dubois
Endemic fauna of the Western Ghats
Fauna of Tamil Nadu
Frogs of India
Amphibians described in 2006
Taxa named by Sathyabhama Das Biju